Duvaucelia lineata is a species of dendronotid nudibranch. It is a marine gastropod mollusc in the family Tritoniidae. Previously known as Tritonia lineata this species was moved to the genus Duvaucelia in 2020.

Description 
Duvaucelia lineata was originally discovered in 1846 and described by British malacologists Joshua Alder and Albany Hancock in 1848.

The original text (the type description) reads as follows:

Distribution 
The type locality is Scarborough, North Yorkshire, England. Duvaucelia lineata is found at scattered localities on the coasts of Great Britain and Ireland and in southern Norway and Brittany, France. It has also been reported from the Adriatic Sea, Croatia.

References
This article incorporates public domain text from reference.

Tritoniidae
Gastropods described in 1848